Kushedya Hari Yudo (born 16 July 1993) is an Indonesian professional footballer who plays as a forward for Liga 1 club Arema and the Indonesia national team.

Club career

Kalteng Putra
After years of struggling in third-tier clubs on Indonesia's more developed islands of Java and Bali, including several moments of considering to quit the football world, Yudo in 2018 moved to the forested island of Borneo to join Liga 2 club Kalteng Putra for one year. Beyond expectations, he scored 14 goals for the Central Kalimantan club in the 2018 Liga 2 season and almost brought the team to win promotion to Liga 1. Minnow Kalteng Putra narrowly missed the cut.

PSS Sleman
Nonetheless, Yudo's breakout 2018 performance led the club that topped the 2018 Liga 2 competition, PSS Sleman, to hire him for the 2019 Liga 1 season. Yudo made his league debut in a 3–1 win against Arema on 15 May 2019 as a substitute for Arsyad Yusgiantoro in the 59th minute. Yudo scored his first league goal for PSS Sleman in a 3–1 loss over TIRA-Persikabo at the Pakansari Stadium. His five goals and four assists for PSS made his name finally recognized in Indonesia's footballing world.

Arema
Amid offers from various clubs, Yudo in 2020 joined his hometown club Arema for the 2020 Liga 1 season. He made his league debut for the club, in a 0–2 win against TIRA-Persikabo on 2 March 2020 and Yudo also scored his first goal with scored a brace, he scored in the 5th and 49th minutes. With his two goals in a match against TIRA-Persikabo triggered the interest of Indonesia national football team coach Shin Tae-yong who was appointed two months before. Shin included Yudo in training camps in 2020 and 2021, leading to his selection for the coach's first senior team line-up in May 2021.

Yudo starting his new 2021–22 season of Liga 1 appearance on 5 September 2021, coming on as a starter in a 1–1 draw with PSM Makassar at the Pakansari Stadium. On 27 October 2021, he scored his first goal of the season in a match against Persita Tangerang, final result, Arema draw 2–2. Five days later, he scored the opening goal in a 1–2 win against Madura United at the Sultan Agung Stadium.

International career 
Despite having zero experience playing for his country at all levels, Yudo received a call to join the senior team in May 2021 to be part of the Indonesia team for the 2022 FIFA World Cup qualification matches in the United Arab Emirates. He earned his first senior cap at the late age of 27 in a 25 May 2021 friendly match in Dubai against Afghanistan, which was a warm-up ahead of the qualifiers.

Career statistics

Club

International

Honours

Club 
Kalteng Putra
 Liga 2 third place (play-offs): 2018

Arema
 Indonesia President's Cup: 2022

International
Indonesia
 AFF Championship runner-up: 2020

References

External links
 Kushedya Hari Yudo at Liga Indonesia
 

1993 births
Living people
Indonesian footballers
Association football forwards
Sportspeople from East Java
People from Malang
PSS Sleman players
Persegres Gresik players
Gresik United players
Persewangi Banyuwangi players
Persekam Metro players
Kalteng Putra F.C. players
Arema F.C. players
Liga 1 (Indonesia) players
Liga 2 (Indonesia) players
Indonesia international footballers